Empowered is an original English-language manga style comic written and illustrated by Adam Warren. Described by Warren as a “sexy superhero comedy", Empowered began to take shape in 2004 with a series of commissioned sketches of a damsel in distress; these illustrations became the basis for short comic stories that helped develop the characters for the Empowered series.

Warren says that Empowered is "nominally a superhero title, yet it’s drawn by a clearly manga-influenced artist". The pages are greyscale reproductions of pencil "layouts", and they are neither inked nor toned (as in the screentones common in manga).

Plot
Empowered chronicles the story of the titular character, a superheroine whose civilian name is Elissa Megan Powers, but is more commonly referred to as "Emp" (originally after her initials, E.M.P.).

Empowered is a young blonde woman who is highly self-conscious about her figure, and has other self-esteem issues. She was inspired to become a superhero and help others after witnessing the death of her father at a very early age, going so far as to get a degree in "Metahuman Studies" while attending an unnamed college. She obtains a unique "hypermembrane" supersuit through unknown means but the suit is both very revealing and unreliable. Her concern over her appearance frequently serves as a dominant aspect of her career as a superheroine, as her "hypermembrane" supersuit is composed of an extremely fragile material; a material so thin and clingy that it outlines every curve of her body. Additionally, while her suit can provide her with several fantastic powers, such as super strength and directed energy blasts, these enhancements will usually fail if her suit becomes too damaged. Due to the fragility of her suit, this has happened frequently, and thus, she has earned herself a reputation for being ineffective and easily defeated ... and subsequently tied up. Despite these many limitations, Empowered still manages to triumph in both her personal and professional lives using her intellect and determination, even if she rarely gains accolades for said heroic acts from the public at large.

She is also an associate-level member of the Superhomeys superhero group, who are the primary defenders of the city in which they reside. Within the group, Empowered is an active participant in many of the battles against the multitude of villains that threaten the metropolis. However, because of the unreliability of her suit, she is commonly defeated and captured. And, because of the villains' unwillingness to violate the unspoken rules of superhero/supervillain interaction, she is frequently hogtied and left for the Superhomeys to eventually rescue. Due to the frequency of this, she has a reputation within the Superhomeys as being "bondage-prone" and is something of a laughingstock. Empowered continually fights alongside them despite their lack of respect toward her and her own suit's unreliable nature, due to her unwavering determination to help people as best as she is able. While her teammates often soundly dismiss her contributions, she has managed to save the lives of the Superhomeys singlehandedly on at least two occasions. Empowered is also portrayed as being more morally upstanding, idealistic and noble than the majority of her more powerful, cynical teammates and members of the superhuman community at large.

Although Empowered is continually subjected to humiliation in her career as a superheroine, she does have close companionship and emotional support from her boyfriend, who is only known as Thugboy. Thugboy - so called due to his previous career as a thug and henchman to various supervillains - reforms to stand by Empowered's side after meeting her "on the job" and moves in with her in short order. He continually provides her with uplifting emotional support and encouragement despite her misadventures and nigh-on continual failure to live up to her own expectations. This love and support frequently manifests in the form of sex, which may be beneficial to Empowered's hypermembrane as well as her emotional state since the former seems to mirror the latter.

Emp is also a close friend to a young woman named Kozue Kaburagi, who prefers to be called by the pseudonym "Ninjette". Ninjette (or simply Jette", as she is colloquially known) is a highly trained ninja and runaway princess of the Kaburagi ninja clan, which is based out of New Jersey. She, too, met Empowered on the opposite side of the law but has since reformed, thanks to forming a close friendship with the idealistic Empowered. She has been shown to have both a drinking problem and an unresolved attraction to Thugboy but neither of these problems have ruined their close friendship yet.

Her rival in most respects is respected fellow SuperHomey Sistah Spooky, a powerful, goth-styled black sorceress. She is very resentful of Emp and hugely successful.  As a child, Spooky attended a private school full of "shallow, preppy bitches" with perfect bodies, icy glares, and flowing blonde tresses. She was so scarred by this that she developed a lifelong pathological hatred of beautiful blondes, and attempted to contact eldritch magickal entities in order to murder them, only to find out that her peers were already the clients of those same entities, as part of a package to sell your soul to be perfectly hot for the rest of your life. She eventually bought the package herself, but was later told that a decimal point was misplaced, giving her "waaaaay too much mystical power", which she used to become a superhero and achieve international fame. Emp, who already has blonde hair and shares characteristics with the preppy bitches (all seemingly without selling her soul, and continuously mentioning that she has to work out constantly and diet to within an inch of her life without looking like a fat slob in what basically amounts to a coat of body paint), is shown to be a constant target of Sistah Spooky's hatred. Additionally, her prejudice caused extreme tension in her lesbian relationship with blonde telepath Mindfuck, eventually leading to them breaking up.

The final member of Empowered's primary supporting cast is an immortal, cosmically powerful being called The Caged Demonwolf, whom Empowered prevented from destroying the Earth by imprisoning its essence within a "bondage belt" gained from another of her previous misadventures.  When the Superhomeys refused to take the now sentient and enraged belt into storage, Empowered was forced to hold on to it, much to her chagrin. While The Caged Demonwolf was initially hostile, it has since become both an advisor and friend to Empowered, Thugboy and Ninjette. The Caged Demonwolf also has a humorously unfortunate tendency to speak only in turgid, long-winded, and unnecessarily alliterative speeches, which often obscure the points it is attempting to make. It also breaks the fourth wall to address the audience directly on occasion. To keep it entertained, Emp has placed The Caged Demonwolf on her living room coffee table so it can watch TV, listen to sports talk radio, and generally interact with the comings and goings of Emp's household.

A running gag in the strip is the promise to show people things that never get delivered along with some of the things that do, such as why Emp's suit doesn't show camel toe and the appearance of "Were-giraffe by Night".

Setting
Empowered is based in an as yet unnamed city on the West Coast. Similar in respects to fictional cities such as DC Comics’ Metropolis or Gotham City, the City is nearly constantly beset by a plethora of super-powered and non-powered villains who largely are never shown to have any goals beyond causing chaos.

Alternate locations within the Empowered universe include the "Homeycrib" (the central headquarters for the Superhomeys superhero group), the Joint Superteam Space Station 3 (commonly referred to as "the D10" and similar to the Justice League Watchtower), and various underground locations only accessible through a matter transportation system (similar to the Watchtower's 'Slideways' teleportation system) known as the Lotus Network. Also mentioned is the "world famous suprahuman treatment wing of the Purple Paladin Memorial Hospital."

Powers and abilities
Emp's super suit imparts both voluntary powers, controlled intentionally by the wearer; involuntary powers, passive abilities that become active without conscious intent of the wearer; and physical attributes that do not necessarily enhance the function of the suit but are active nonetheless. Most of the suit's powers function only for Emp, but it is unclear as to whether this is by the suit's decision, or its nature. Most of the suit's powers degrade or vanish as it takes damage. The suit does not function if covered with any material, so Emp cannot protect it with additional armor. It has been shown that Emp can retain some of its powers through confidence.

Voluntary abilities of Empowered's super suit
 Superhuman strength. Emp herself describes her physical strength, while the suit is undamaged, as approximating that of ten fit men.
 Invisibility. This ability is purely voluntary, but the invisibility effect does not extend to the wearer, essentially making Emp appear nude whenever she tries to use it. It is also possible for Emp to make sections of the suit turn invisible while other sections remain visible. This ability was advantageous for her to trick dWarf/Fleshmaster into allowing her into the back-stage control room from which he was orchestrating the sabotage of the Caped Justice Awards ceremony.
 Various visual enhancements including magnification and x-ray vision. These visual enhancements remain usable, even if the suit has been damaged to the point that all other voluntary powers have ceased functioning.
 The ability to cling to all surfaces. Emp discovered this power accidentally when she was flung to the underside of the outstretched hand of a large statue.
 High-intensity directed energy discharges. Emp has marginal control of these energy blasts, and varying ability to direct them. She has improved in this area as the series has progressed, for example becoming markedly more accurate when Thugboy was in danger of death, but this has not deterred the foes that she faces, nor does it seem to decrease the frequency at which Emp is captured. 
 The suit can be used to make phone calls, although whether the suit is acting as a mobile phone or as an extension of an already existing landline is not clarified.

The voluntary abilities of Emp's suit are usually lost when too much of the suit's fragile material is ripped away. Despite this often-exploited drawback, Empowered's suit also has many abilities that are not directly controlled, and usually remain functional.

Automatic functions
 The suit is able to absorb or deflect all damage that may be directed at it while leaving Empowered unharmed. This has been demonstrated with gunfire, various bladed weapons, blunt impacts, and even a shark bite. Although this usually leaves the suit itself greatly damaged, Emp has never been subject to bodily harm, with a single exception during a confrontation with a mind-controlled Ninjette wielding a magic katana, who was able to wound her.
 The suit is capable of self-repair – very slowly, however. This appears to somehow be tied to either Emp's sexual activity or her self-confidence. and it has been implied that Emp has become something of a sex maniac since she began using the suit.
 The suit can protect Empowered while exposed to outer space, seemingly keeping her body pressurized, protected from extreme temperatures, shielded from ambient radiation, and allowing her to breathe as if in normal atmosphere. This can happen despite the suit being damaged in several places, exposing Emp's bare skin.
 The suit can manifest structures somewhat resembling the skeleton of a bat's wings, enabling Emp to hover. At the same time, when manifesting this "skeletal" wings, the suit can shoot wide-radius energy blasts that are incredibly more powerful and damaging than Emp's normal discharges. Emp is unaware of this ability, as the suit apparently was mind-controlling her the only two times it was used.
 The suit protects Emp from concussive brain injury and even reversed a childhood brain injury.
 After a year and a half of wear, the suit “seems to be part of” Emp’s DNA, according to dWARf!/Fleshmaster. It is unclear what effect this will have on Emp or on the suit’s functional abilities.

In addition to voluntary and involuntary abilities, the suit also has some abilities that are active regardless of the person interacting with the material of the hypermembrane:
 The suit can “knit” itself around the hair follicles on Empowered's scalp, giving the appearance that the cowl of the suit is really an accessory mask. This may be one of the only “abilities” of the suit that is not reliant on Emp being the user as this function occurred with a male wearer of the suit who stole it from Emp in an attempt to gain its abilities.
 The suit can greatly accentuate the sensations from sexual stimulation. It is not clear if this effect can be experienced by anyone, as long as Emp is involved, or if this is another example of the suit having a passive effect on anybody.
 The suit sometimes acts autonomously, taking on the physical dimensions of Emp without her actually wearing it. The only character shown to interact with the suit while it does this is The Caged Demonwolf, who uses it to telephone and talk to Emp's mother.

Other characters

Publications
The following volumes either already have been or are scheduled to be released as Trade Paperbacks by Dark Horse:

The first nine volumes have also been collected in hardcover editions:

A comic book titled empowered Special: The Wench With a Million Sighs was released in 2009 and is the first empowered book in a traditional comic book format. These specials have continued, appearing sporadically. Starting with the second comic, the specials have included art by other artists, generally in color, though special #5 is entirely in black and white, with the guest artist's pages being inked rather than shot straight from the pencils as Adam Warren's are.

The empowered Specials are:

The first six Specials have been collected into a trade paperback "empowered Unchained Volume 1", and Specials #7 and #8 into "empowered and the Soldier of Love": Special #9 has been collected into a trade paperback called "empowered and Sistah Spooky's Highschool Hell".

Reception
Critical reception to the series has been mostly positive, with volumes of the series receiving positive reviews from Comic Book Resources, Pop Culture Shock, and Comics Alliance. Of volume 6, Comics Alliance said that "even in the middle of constant T&A, Warren's strong sense of humor and character shines through. Without it, "Empowered" 6 would be just another lame softcore comic, but the narrative, the characters, and the self-indulgent winks at the reader prop "Empowered" up as something more than your typical sexy superhero fare."

References

Notes

External links
 Official Web Comic site, where Adam Warren is posting the full comic online.
 Empowered Profile, Dark Horse Comics website
 Press Release for volume 1, volume 2, Dark Horse Comics website
 Empowered Vol 1 Preview, Dark Horse Comics website
 Free online short story, official Dark Horse Comics MySpace page

Superhero comics
Dark Horse Comics titles
2007 comics debuts
Adult humour titles
Dark Horse Comics superheroes
Webcomics from print
Fictional characters from California
Original English-language manga
Parody superheroes